This article records new taxa of fossil plants that are scheduled to be described during the year 2019, as well as other significant discoveries and events related to paleobotany that are scheduled to occur in the year 2019.

Mosses

Liverworts

Ferns and fern allies

Lycophytes

Conifers

Araucariaceae

Cupressaceae

Pinceae

Podocarpaceae

Other conifers
{| class="wikitable sortable" align="center" width="100%"
|-
! Name
! Novelty
! Status
! Authors
! Age
! Type locality
! Location
! Notes
! Images
|-
|
Cephalotaxus maguanensis
|
Sp. nov
|
Valid
|
Zhang et al.
|
Middle Miocene
|
|

|
A species of Cephalotaxus.
|
|-
|
Cupressinocladus shelikhovii
|
Sp. nov
|
Valid
|
Golovneva
|
Late Cretaceous (Coniacian)
|
Chingandzha Formation
|

|
A cheirolepidiaceous species
|
|-
|Frenelopsis justae|
Sp. nov
|
Valid
|
Barral et al.|
Early Cretaceous (Albian)
|
Escucha Formation
|

|
A member of the family Cheirolepidiaceae.
|
|-
|Ningxiaites shitanjingensis|
Sp. nov
|
Valid
|
Wei et al.|
Permian (Changhsingian)
|
Sunjiagou Formation
|

|
A conifer wood.
|
|-
|Protocupressinoxylon carrizalense|
Sp. nov
|
Valid
|
Correa et al.|
Late Triassic
|
Carrizal Formation
|

|
|
|-
|}

Other seed plants

Flowering plants
Basal angiosperms
Nymphaeales

Other basal angiosperms

Monocots
Alismatales

Arecales

Dioscoreales

Poales

Magnoliids
Laurales

Magnoliales

Piperales

Unplaced non-eudicots
Chloranthales

Basal eudicots
Proteales

Ranunculales

Superasterids
Aquifoliales

Asterales

Boraginales

Caryophyllales

Cornales

Ericales

Gentianales

Icacinales

Superrosids
Malvids
Malvales

Sapindales

Other malvids

Fabids
Fabales

Fagales

Malpighiales

Oxalidales

Rosales

Unplaced superrosid eudicots

Other angiosperms

Other plants

General research
 Description of fossils of filamentous green algae from the Early Devonian Rhynie chert (Scotland) is published by Wellman, Graham & Lewis (2019).
 Cretaceous alga Falsolikanella campanensis, originally assigned to the tribe Diploporeae within the green alga order Dasycladales, is transferred to the genus Actinoporella within the tribe Acetabularieae, family Polyphysaceae by Barattolo et al. (2019).
 A study on the impact of the Cretaceous–Paleogene extinction event on European charophytes is published by Vicente, Csiki-Sava & Martín-Closas (2019).
 The oldest known trilete spore assemblages reported so far are described from the Sandbian successions from Motala (central Sweden) by Rubinstein & Vajda (2019).
 A study on the composition and distribution of dispersed spore assemblages from Middle Devonian deposits of northern Spain, and on their implications for inferring the nature of the Kačák Event, is published by Askew & Wellman (2019).
 A study on the morphology of the spore taxon Lagenoisporites magnus from the Carboniferous (Tournaisian) Toregua Formation (Bolivia) is published by Quetglas, Macluf & di Pasquo (2019).
 A review of research concerning early evolution of land plants during the Ordovician is published by Servais et al. (2019).
 A study on carbon isotope data from stratigraphic sections at Germany Valley (West Virginia) and Union Furnace (Pennsylvania) in the Central Appalachian Basin, evaluating its implications for the knowledge of change in atmospheric oxygen levels during the late Ordovician and its possible relationship with early diversification of land plants, is published by Adiatma et al. (2019).
 A study on the stable carbon isotopic composition of 190 fossil specimens belonging to 12 genera of Devonian and Early Carboniferous land plants is published by Wan et al. (2019).
 A study on the early evolution of vascular plants is published by Cascales‐Miñana et al. (2019).
 A study on the evolution of early vascular plants is published by Crepet & Niklas (2019).
 A study on the fine‐scale structure and the chemistry of the tracheids of the earliest known woody plant Armoricaphyton chateaupannense is published by Strullu‐Derrien et al. (2019).
 A study on diversity and functions of lycopsid reproductive structures through time, based on data from extant and fossil taxa, is published by Bonacorsi & Leslie (2019).
 Redescription of the morphology of sterile and fertile structures of the Devonian lycopsid Kossoviella timanica is published by Orlova et al. (2019).
 A study on the ultrastructure of the spore wall in the Carboniferous lycopsid Oxroadia gracilis is published by Taylor (2019).
 A slab containing rooting systems which probably belonged to rhizomorphic lycopsids is reported from the Lower Permian Abo Formation (New Mexico, United States) by Hetherington et al. (2019).
 A study on the anatomy and affinities of Cheirostrobus pettycurensis is published by Neregato & Hilton (2019), who report the discovery of spores conforming to the species Retusotriletes incohatus associated with fossils of Cheirostrobus, representing the first discovery of Retusotriletes-type spores reported in situ within sphenophytes.
 A study on the anatomy and affinities of silicified stems of Sphenophyllum from the Tournaisian deposits in the Montagne Noire region of France and in the Saalfeld area in Germany is published by Terreaux de Felice, Decombeix & Galtier (2019).
 Fossils assigned to the genus Equisetum are reported from a new fossil plant assemblage of late Eocene or early Oligocene age from central Queensland (Australia) by Rozefelds et al. (2019), representing the first evidence of this genus from the Cenozoic of Australia and the most recent fossil record of this genus from Australia.
 A study on the evolutionary history of horsetails, based on genetic data and fossil record, is published by Clark, Puttick & Donoghue (2019), who report evidence indicative of two successive whole-genome duplication events occurring during the Carboniferous and Triassic rather than in association with the Cretaceous–Paleogene extinction event.
 A study aiming to determine links between volcanic activity in the Central Atlantic magmatic province, elevated concentrations of mercury in marine and terrestrial sediments and abnormalities of fossil fern spores across the Triassic-Jurassic boundary in southern Scandinavia and northern Germany is published by Lindström et al. (2019).
 A study on the fossil record of fern spores at the Cretaceous-Paleogene boundary, on the viability of fern spores, and on their implications for the knowledge of the duration of the impact winter at the Cretaceous-Paleogene boundary is published by Berry (2019).
 A study on the molecular structural characteristics of organic remains of a fern belonging to the family Osmundaceae from the Early Jurassic Korsaröd site in southern Sweden is published by Qu et al. (2019).
 A study on anatomy and growth of large specimens of the fossil fern species Weichselia reticulata from the Barremian La Huérguina Formation (Spain) is published by Blanco-Moreno et al. (2019).
 A study on the morphological characters of 42 fossil species of Dicksoniaceae from China, and on their implications for the taxonomy of the fossil members of this group, is published by Xin et al. (2019).
 Fossil occurrences of members of the genus Christella are reported from the late Paleocene of Liuqu, southern Tibet and middle Miocene of the Jinggu Basin in western Yunnan (China) by Xu et al. (2019), who transfer the species "Cyclosorus" nervosus Tao (1988) to the genus Christella.
 A study on the fossils of Glossopteris from the Permian succession of eastern India, aiming to identify the molecular signatures of solvent-extractable and non-extractable organic matter, will be published by Tewari et al. (2019).
 A study on the diversity trends of Glossopteris flora from the Barakar, Raniganj, and Panchet formations of Tatapani–Ramkola Coalfield (India) is published by Saxena et al. (2019).
 A study on the architecture of the ovuliferous reproductive organs of Permian glossopterids is published by Mcloughlin & Prevec (2019).
 A study on the pinnule and stomatal morphology of extant and fossil members of the genera Bowenia and Eobowenia, and on its implications for the knowledge of adaptations of fossil plants to different environments, is published by Hill, Hill & Watling (2019).
 Seed of the ginkgoalean Yimaia capituliformis with damage interpreted as likely oviposition lesions inflicted by a kalligrammatid lacewing is described from the Middle Jurassic Jiulongshan Formation (China) by Meng et al. (2019).
 A study on the phytogeographic history of ten conifer genera that are endemic to East Asia, based on fossil data from humid temperate forests in the Japanese Islands and Korean Peninsula, is published by Yabe et al. (2019).
 A study on the evolution of male and female cone sizes in members of the family Araucariaceae, as indicated by data from extant and fossil members of this family, is published by Gleiser et al. (2019).
 Five fossil foliage specimens of Calocedrus lantenoisi, representing one of the earliest records of the genus Calocedrus worldwide, are described from the Oligocene Shangcun Formation of the Maoming Basin (Guangdong Province, South China) by Wu et al. (2019).
 Leaves including cuticles and ovuliferous cones of members of the genus Metasequoia are described from the middle Miocene of Zhenyuan, Yunnan (Southwest China) by Wang et al. (2019), comprising the southernmost fossil record of this genus worldwide.
 A review of the fossil record of woods which might have affinities with Taxaceae, and a study on the palaeobiogeographical history of this family, is published by Philippe et al. (2019).
 Putative Cretaceous siliceous sponge Siphonia bovista is reinterpreted as an internal mould of the cone-like plant fossil Dammarites albens by Niebuhr (2019).
 A review of epidermal features of bennettites, comparing them with analogous features in living taxa and aiming to identify homologous character states, is published by Rudall & Bateman (2019).
 The first fossil record of a cycad seedling found in close association with a leaf flush of an adult cycad plant of the same species (Dioonopsis praespinulosa) is reported from the Palaeocene (Danian) Castle Rock flora in the Denver Basin (Colorado, United States) by Erdei et al. (2019).
 A review of the paleobotanical evidence of the age and early history of the flowering plants is published by Coiro, Doyle & Hilton (2019).
 A study aiming to establish when the flowering plants originated is published by Li et al. (2019).
 Presence of endothelium (a specialized seed tissue that develops from the inner epidermis of the inner integument) is reported in several different kinds of flowering plant seeds (including in the lineage leading to extant Chloranthaceae) from the Early Cretaceous of eastern North America and Portugal by Friis, Crane & Pedersen (2019).
 A study on the phylogenetic relationships of palm fruit fossils from the Cretaceous–Paleogene (Maastrichtian–Danian) Deccan Intertrappean Beds (India) is published by Matsunaga et al. (2019), who interpret these fossils as representing a crown group member of palm subtribe Hyphaeninae (tribe Borasseae, subfamily Coryphoideae) related to extant genera Satranala and Bismarckia.
 Fossil fruits of members of the genera Fragaria and Rubus are reported from the Pliocene outcrops in the Heqing Basin (China) by Huang et al. (2019).
 Description of alder leaf and infructescence fossils from the Upper Eocene Lawula Formation (Qinghai–Tibetan Plateau) is published by Xu, Su & Zhou (2019).
 A study on the morphology, paleoecology, historical biogeography and phylogenetic relationships of fossil pollen of members of Malvaceae belonging to the species Rhoipites guianensis and Malvacipolloides maristellae, and on its implications for inferring the impact of Cenozoic geological processes (including the uplift of the Andes) on members of Malvaceae living in northern South America, is published by Hoorn et al. (2019).
 A study aiming to determine the location of refugia of two North American species of hickories during the Last Glacial Maximum on the basis of genomic data is published by Bemmels, Knowles & Dick (2019).
 A study on functional leaf traits of the Eocene-Miocene taxa Rhodomyrtophyllum reticulosum (family Myrtaceae) and Platanus neptuni (family Platanaceae), evaluating whether leaf traits of these taxa reflect environmental conditions including climate, is published by Moraweck et al. (2019).
 A study on the morphology and phylogenetic relationships of Eocene fruits belonging to the species Mastixicarpum crassum and Eomastixia bilocularis is published by Manchester & Collinson (2019).
 Seeds of Eurya stigmosa are reported from the Early Pleistocene lacustrine and fluvial sediments of Porto da Cruz, Madeira by Góis-Marques et al. (2019).
 A study on the putative cycad "Zamia" australis from the Miocene Ñirihuau Formation (Argentina) is published by Passalia, Caviglia & Vera (2019), who reinterpret the fossil specimens as flowering plant leaves, and transfer this species to the genus Lithraea.
 New method for reconstructing water transport properties of fossil wood is proposed by Tanrattana et al. (2019).
 Signatures of Devonian (Famennian) forests and soils preserved in black shales in the southernmost Appalachian Basin (Chattanooga Shale; Alabama, United States) are presented by Lu et al. (2019).
 A study on reproductive structures of Devonian plants and on their implications for the knowledge of large-scale patterns of reproductive evolution over the Devonian is published by Bonacorsi & Leslie (2019).
 Revision of a fossil plant assemblage from the Carboniferous site in San Juan Province, Argentina known as Retamito or Río del Agua is published by Correa & Césari (2019).
 A study on the stratigraphic ranges and diversities of plant taxa from the upper Permian (Lopingian) to the Middle Triassic is published by Nowak, Schneebeli-Hermann & Kustatscher (2019), who interpret their findings as indicating that the extinction of land plants during the Permian–Triassic extinction event was much less severe than previously thought.
 A study on the timing of the collapse of the Permian Glossopteris flora from the Sydney Basin (Australia) is published by Fielding et al. (2019).
 New fossil flora dominated by cuticles of Dicroidium is reported from the Middle Triassic (Anisian) Mukheiris Formation (Jordan) by Abu Hamad et al. (2019).
 A study on changes of land vegetation resulting from the Toarcian oceanic anoxic event is published by Slater et al. (2019).
 Plant disseminules are documented from four Middle Jurassic to Lower Cretaceous lacustrine Lagerstätten in China and Australia by McLoughlin & Pott (2019).
 A study comparing the Jurassic floras of the Ayuquila Basin and the Otlaltepec Basin (Mexico) and evaluating their implications for the knowledge of the Jurassic environments of these basins is published by Velasco-de León et al. (2019).
 A study on phototropism in extant trees from Beijing and Jilin Provinces and fossil tree trunks from the Jurassic Tiaojishan and Tuchengzi formations in Liaoning and Beijing regions (China), and on its implications for inferring the history of the rotation of the North China Block, is published by Jiang et al. (2019).
 A study on the link between climatic changes and changes plant distribution in South America during the Early Cretaceous, as indicated by palynological data from the Aptian of the Sergipe Basin (Brazil), is published by Carvalho et al. (2019).
 A study on the frequency and diversity of damage types caused by insect oviposition in plants from the Upper Triassic Yangcaogou Formation, Middle Jurassic Jiulongshan Formation and Lower Cretaceous Yixian Formation (China), assessing the degree of plant host specificity, is published by Lin et al. (2019).
 A study on the plant specimens (ferns, gymnosperms and angiosperms) from the Lower Cretaceous Araripe Basin (Brazil) preserving evidence of plant–insect interactions and potentially of paleoecological relationships between plants and insects is published by Edilson Bezerra dos Santos Filho et al. (2019).
 Leaves of members of the family Nymphaeaceae preserving evidence of insect herbivory are reported from the Albian Utrillas Formation (Spain) by Estévez-Gallardo et al. (2019).
 A study on Cenomanian plants from the Redmond no.1 mine near Schefferville (Redmond Formation; Labrador Peninsula, Canada) and on their implications for the knowledge of paleoclimate of this site is published by Demers‐Potvin & Larsson (2019).
 A study on the canopy structure of Late Cretaceous and Paleocene forests in South America, as indicated by the carbon isotope composition of fossil angiosperm leaves from two localities in the Paleocene Cerrejón Formation and one locality in the Maastrichtian Guaduas Formation (Colombia), is published by Graham et al. (2019).
 A quantitative analysis of an earliest Paleocene megaflora from the Ojo Alamo Sandstone in the San Juan Basin (New Mexico, United States) is published by Flynn & Peppe (2019).
 A study on the evolution of plant assemblages in the area of Primorye (Russia) throughout the Paleogene is published by Bondarenko, Blokhina & Utescher (2019).
 A study on changes in plant and insect communities across the Paleocene–Eocene boundary within the Hanna Basin (Wyoming, United States) is published by Azevedo Schmidt et al. (2019).
 A study on stomata of fossil specimens of members of the family Lauraceae from the Eocene of Australia and New Zealand, evaluating their implications for reconstructions of Eocene pCO2 levels, is published by Steinthorsdottir et al. (2019).
 Description of early Eocene leaf fossils from the Dinmore locality (Redbank Plains Formation, Booval Basin; Australia) and a study on the implications of these fossils for reconstructions of paleoclimate is published by Pole (2019).
 A study on changes of plant communities from the Herren beds (Oregon, United States) during the Eocene and on the implications of plant fossils from this area for the reconstruction of Eocene climate is published by Jijina, Currano & Constenius (2019).
 Su et al. (2019) use radiometrically dated plant fossil assemblages to quantify when southeastern Tibet achieved its present elevation, and what kind of floras existed there at that time.
 Description of a plant megafossil assemblage from the Kailas Formation in western part of the southern Lhasa terrane, and a study on its implications for inferring the elevation history of the southern Tibetan Plateau, is published by Ai et al. (2019).
 A study on the dynamics and evolution of the flora of Turgai ecological type in Western Siberia during the early Oligocene to earliest Miocene is published by Popova et al. (2019).
 A study on the paleoclimate, vegetational type and ecological strategies adopted by fossil plants from the Oligocene Baigang Formation (China), as indicated by characteristics of fossil leaves from this formation, is published by Li et al. (2019).
 Description of a fossil plant assemblage from the Miocene Hattiesburg Formation (Mississippi, United States) is published by McNair et al. (2019).
 A study on changes of C4 vegetation composition in southwestern Montana (United States) from the late Miocene through present is published by Hyland et al. (2019).
 A study aiming to test the hypothesis that fire contributed to the rise of C3-dominated grasslands in Eurasia, based on data from core retrieved from the late Miocene to Pleistocene sediments from the Black Sea, is published by Feurdean & Vasiliev (2019).
 A study on the origin of the African C4 savannah grasslands is published by Polissar et al. (2019).
 A study on vegetation changes in west African tropical montane forest over the past 90,000 years, as indicated by pollen data from the Lake Bambili site (Cameroon), is published by Lézine et al. (2019).
 A study on changes of vegetation in southern Borneo over the past 40,000  calibrated years BP, as indicated by data from Saleh Cave (South Kalimantan, Indonesia), is published by Wurster et al. (2019).
 A study on the role of past climate, extinct megafauna and guanaco in shaping the vegetation of the Patagonian steppe is published by Hernández, Ríos & Perotto-Baldivieso (2019).
 The discovery of ancient chestnut, hazelnut and flax DNA recovered from stalagmites from the Solkota cave (Georgia) is reported by Stahlschmidt et al. (2019).
 The discovery of oldest fossil trees, dating back 386 million years, in the Catskill region near Cairo, New York, is published online by Stein et al.'' (2019).

References

2019 in paleontology
Paleobotany